Wish I'd Taken Pictures is the third studio album, fourth album overall, by American queercore band Pansy Division, released on February 13, 1996 by Lookout! Records and Mint Records.

The front and back covers feature photographs of Mark Ewert and Moon Trent, taken by Marc Geller. Both men previously appeared on the cover of Pansy Division's 1994 album Deflowered and subsequently appeared twenty years later on the cover of their 2016 album Quite Contrary, photographed in the same location.

The cassette release of this album is unique compared to other Lookout! Records albums in that it comes in a clear purple shell.

Track listing

Personnel
Pansy Division
Jon Ginoli – vocals, guitars
Chris Freeman – vocals, basses, guitars
Dustin Donaldson – drums, percussion

Additional musicians
Kirk Heydt – cello

References

1996 albums
Pansy Division albums
Mint Records albums